Barkan is an Israeli settlement in the northern West Bank, about 8 km west of the Palestinian city of Salfit, under the administrative local government of the Shomron Regional Council.

The international community considers Israeli settlements in the West Bank illegal under international law, but the Israeli government disputes this.

History
Founded in June 1981 by secular Israelis from the Beitar and Herut movements, Barkan  is part of a chain of settlements built along the Trans-Samaria Highway, and adjacent to the Barkan Industrial Park. The park, established in 1982, has  120 businesses and factories manufacturing plastics, metal-work, food, textile, and more. Of the 5,000 workers, 90% are Palestinian Arabs.

According to ARIJ, Israel confiscated land from two Palestinian villages in order to construct Barkan: 167 dunams from Qarawat Bani Hassan, and 353 dunams from Sarta.

"Barkan" is called after the Hebrew name of the Syrian thistle. The original name of the town was Beit Abba after Abba Ahimeir, a leader of the Lehi.

Archaeology
An archeological site east of the town contains remnants of an Israelite settlement during the time of the first and second temples.

See also
 Barkan Industrial Park

References

External links
Menachem Brody's photos of Barkan

Non-religious Israeli settlements
Populated places established in 1981
1981 establishments in the Israeli Military Governorate
Israeli settlements in the West Bank